Unbinilium (120Ubn) has not yet been synthesised, so all data would be theoretical and a standard atomic weight cannot be given. Like all synthetic elements, it would have no stable isotopes.

List of isotopes 
No isotopes of unbinilium are known.

Nucleosynthesis

Target-projectile combinations leading to Z = 120 compound nuclei
The below table contains various combinations of targets and projectiles that could be used to form compound nuclei with Z=120.

Hot fusion

238U(64Ni,xn)302-xUbn
In April 2007, the team at the GSI Helmholtz Centre for Heavy Ion Research in Darmstadt, Germany attempted to create unbinilium using a 238U target and a 64Ni beam:

 +  → * → no atoms

No atoms were detected, providing a limit of 1.6 pb for the cross section at the energy provided. The GSI repeated the experiment with higher sensitivity in three separate runs in April–May 2007, January–March 2008, and September–October 2008, all with negative results, reaching a cross section limit of 90 fb.

244Pu(58Fe,xn)302-xUbn
Following their success in obtaining oganesson by the reaction between 249Cf and 48Ca in 2006, the team at the Joint Institute for Nuclear Research (JINR) in Dubna started  experiments in March–April 2007 to attempt to create unbinilium with a 58Fe beam and a 244Pu target. Initial analysis revealed that no atoms of unbinilium were produced, providing a limit of 400 fb for the cross section at the energy studied.

 +  → * → no atoms

The Russian team planned to upgrade their facilities before attempting the reaction again.

248Cm(54Cr,xn)302-xUbn
In 2011, after upgrading their equipment to allow the use of more radioactive targets, scientists at the GSI attempted the rather asymmetrical fusion reaction:

 +  → * → no atoms

It was expected that the change in reaction would quintuple the probability of synthesizing unbinilium, as the yield of such reactions is strongly dependent on their asymmetry. Although this reaction is less asymmetric than the 249Cf+50Ti reaction, it also creates more neutron-rich unbinilium isotopes that should receive increased stability from their proximity to the shell closure at N = 184. Three signals were observed in May 2011; a possible assignment to 299Ubn and its daughters was considered, but could not be confirmed, and a different analysis suggested that what was observed was simply a random sequence of events.

In March 2022, Yuri Oganessian gave a seminar at the JINR considering how one could synthesise element 120 in the 248Cm+54Cr reaction.

249Cf(50Ti,xn)299-xUbn
In August–October 2011, a different team at the GSI using the TASCA facility tried a new, even more asymmetrical reaction:
 +  → * → no atoms

Because of its asymmetry, the reaction between 249Cf and 50Ti was predicted to be the most favorable practical reaction for synthesizing unbinilium, although it is also somewhat cold, and is further away from the neutron shell closure at N = 184 than any of the other three reactions attempted. No unbinilium atoms were identified, implying a limiting cross section of 200 fb. Jens Volker Kratz predicted the actual maximum cross section for producing unbinilium by any of the four reactions 238U+64Ni, 244Pu+58Fe, 248Cm+54Cr, or 249Cf+50Ti to be around 0.1 fb; in comparison, the world record for the smallest cross section of a successful reaction was 30 fb for the reaction 209Bi(70Zn,n)278Nh, and Kratz predicted a maximum cross section of 20 fb for producing ununennium. If these predictions are accurate, then synthesizing ununennium would be at the limits of current technology, and synthesizing unbinilium would require new methods.

This reaction was investigated again in April to September 2012 at the GSI. This experiment used a 249Bk target and a 50Ti beam to produce element 119, but since 249Bk decays to 249Cf with a half-life of about 327 days, both elements 119 and 120 could be searched for simultaneously:
 +  → * → no atoms
 +  → * → no atoms
Neither element 119 nor element 120 was observed. This implied a limiting cross section of 65 fb for producing element 119 in these reactions, and 200 fb for element 120.

In May 2021, the JINR announced plans to investigate the 249Cf+50Ti reaction in their new facility. The 249Cf target would be produced by the Oak Ridge National Laboratory in Oak Ridge, Tennessee, United States; the 50Ti beam would be produced by the Hubert Curien Pluridisciplinary Institute in Strasbourg, Alsace, France. If diplomatic relations between Russia and the United States make this impossible, then the 248Cm+54Cr reaction may be investigated instead, with a Russian-produced 248Cm target and a French-produced 54Cr beam, though the cross section would likely be three to ten times lower.

References 
 Isotope masses from:

 
Unbinilium
unbinilium